Senior Hurling Championship on 11 June 2008.

Table

References

Roscommon GAA club championships
Roscommon Senior Hurling Championship